Camilla may refer to:

People
 Camilla (given name), including a list of people with the name
 Camilla, Queen Consort (born 1947), wife of King Charles III

Places
 Camilla, Georgia, a city in the United States
 Camilla Castle, an alternative name for Hallyards Castle in Scotland

Arts and entertainment
 Camilla (mythology), daughter of King Metabus and Casmilla in Roman mythology
 Camilla (1994 film), a 1994 comedy film
 Camilla (1954 film), a 1954 comedy film
 Camilla (Burney novel), a 1796 novel by Frances Burney (mentioned in Jane Austen's novel Northanger Abbey)
 Camilla Dickinson, a.k.a. Camilla, a novel by Madeleine L'Engle
 Camilla, a 1706 opera by Giovanni Bononcini
 Camilla (opera), 1799 opera by Ferdinando Paer
 Camilla (Fioravanti), 1801 opera by Valentino Fioravanti
 Il trionfo di Camilla, a 1696 or 1697 opera by Giovanni Bononcini
 "Camilla", a song by Basshunter from Now You're Gone – The Album
 Camilla, a character in The Muppet Show

Science and technology
Camilla (spacecraft), a mission concept to explore asteroid 10199 Chariklo
107 Camilla, an asteroid
 Camilla (genus), a genus of flies from the family Camillidae
 HMS Camilla, the name of two ships of the Royal Navy
 MV Camilla Desgagnés, a roll-on, roll-off bulk-carrier

See also
 Camellia, name of the genus that includes tea, Camellia sinensis
 Camille (disambiguation)
 Carmilla (disambiguation)
 Camila (disambiguation)